

Godwine was a medieval Bishop of Rochester. He was consecrated around 1013. He died between 1046 and 1058.

Citations

References

External links
 

Bishops of Rochester
11th-century English Roman Catholic bishops